Strawberry Island is a small island in the San Juan Islands of the U.S. state of Washington. It is located in Rosario Strait near Cypress Island and closes Strawberry Bay.

The island is managed by the Washington Department of Natural Resources.

Strawberry Island has long been popular with kayakers. In 2010, due to budget cuts, the Department of Natural Resources prohibited overnight camping.

George Vancouver named Strawberry Bay and Cypress Island in 1792, but left this island nameless.

References

External links 
 Volunteers Help Maintain Cypress Island after DNR Cuts

Islands of Washington (state)
Islands of Skagit County, Washington
San Juan Islands
Uninhabited islands of Washington (state)